Aestuariivita is a Gram-negative and aerobic genus of bacteria from the family of Rhodobacteraceae with one known species (Aestuariivita boseongensis). Aestuariivita boseongensis has been isolated from tidal flat sediments from Boseong in  Korea.

References

Rhodobacteraceae
Bacteria genera
Monotypic bacteria genera